The 2018 The Princess Maha Chackri Sirindhorn's Cup is a women's cycle stage race that is being held in Thailand from 8 to 10 April 2018. The 2018 edition of the race was the seventh running of The Princess Maha Chackri Sirindhon's Cup, being held with a UCI rating of 2.1.

Teams

Route

Classification leadership table

See also
2018 in women's road cycling

References

2018 in women's road cycling
Cycl
2018